The olive-headed weaver (Ploceus olivaceiceps) is a species of bird in the family Ploceidae.
It is found in Malawi, Mozambique, Tanzania, and Zambia.
Its natural habitat is subtropical or tropical dry forests.
It is threatened by habitat loss.

References

External links
 Olive-headed weaver -  Species text in Weaver Watch.

olive-headed weaver
Birds of East Africa
olive-headed weaver
Taxonomy articles created by Polbot